This is a list of the licensed radio stations in Mexico City that are found on the AM, shortwave and FM bands. Some stations are licensed or have their transmitters in the State of Mexico but primarily serve Mexico City.

AM stations in Mexico City

SW stations in Mexico City

FM stations in Mexico City

Closed Stations 

Amplitude Modulation

Shortwave

Frequency Modulation

References

Mexico City